Stone Dam Mountain is a summit located in Central New York Region of New York located in the Town of Ohio in Herkimer County, northwest of North Wilmurt. Stone Dam Lake is located east of the elevation.

References

Mountains of Herkimer County, New York
Mountains of New York (state)